Chrystee Pharris (born March 7, 1976) is an American actress, best known for her role as Simone Russell on the NBC daytime soap opera Passions.

Life and career
Chrystee Pharris first became known as Simone Russell on the hit NBC-TV daytime soap opera Passions, and she thereafter went on to further her role on the hit show Scrubs as “J.D.’s” girlfriend Kylie. Currently, she can be seen on Craig Ross Jr.’s Monogamy and recurring on Season 3 of Goliath, both on Amazon Prime. She is also executive producing Mercer Island.

She has also guest starred on All of Us, Castle and Nashville. In 2015, Pharris began starring in the POP series, Queens of Drama.

Filmography

Film

Television

References

External links
ChrysteePharris.com

American television actresses
American soap opera actresses
American film actresses
Emerson College alumni
1976 births
Living people
20th-century American actresses
21st-century American actresses
African-American actresses
20th-century African-American women
20th-century African-American people
21st-century African-American women
21st-century African-American people